The South Africa Universities rugby union team – also called the South African Students rugby union team – is a South African representative rugby union team that is usually named on an annual basis and that would participate in first class matches on an intermittent basis.

Since the launch and subsequent growth in popularity of the Varsity Cup competition in 2008, the South African Universities rugby union team effectively became a team selected from the best Varsity Cup players; in 2015, the team was called the Varsity Cup Dream Team.

Players

The most recent squad was named after the 2015 Varsity Cup; this side would play against South Africa Under-20 in Stellenbosch:

 Dan Kriel and Jaco Visagie were originally selected in the 2015 Varsity Cup Dream Team, but subsequently replaced by Johan Deysel and Elandré Huggett respectively.

Results and fixtures

See also

 Varsity Cup
 Emerging Springboks
 South African Barbarians

References

South Africa national rugby union team
University and college rugby union